Hermitage Bay is an expansive bay stretching out along the south coast of Newfoundland. It is a body of Gulf of St. Lawrence which is near the Connaigre Peninsula. On its south, it is bordered by the Hermitage peninsula and the communities of Seal Cove (Fortune Bay), Hermitage and Sandyville. On its north side it is flanked by the communities of McCallum on mainland Newfoundland and by Gaultois on Long Island. Long Island separates Hermitage Bay from Bay d'Espoir farther inland to the north.

References 

Bays of Newfoundland and Labrador